The 2021 Loudoun United FC season was Loudoun United FC's third season of existence, their third in the second-division of American soccer, and their third in the USL Championship.

Club

Roster

Competitions

Exhibitions

USL Championship 

The USLC realigned itself to place the current 31 teams into four regional divisions, with Loudoun in the Atlantic Division. Loudoun would play its divisional rivals four times each (evenly split between home and away matches), with the remaining four games against non-division teams.

Atlantic Division

U.S. Open Cup 

Due to their ownership by a higher division professional club (D.C. United), LUFC is one of 15 teams expressly forbidden from entering the Cup competition.

References 

Loudoun United FC seasons
Loudoun United FC
Loudoun United FC
Loudoun United